Stéphane Cordinier (born 17 April 1970) is a French handball player. He competed in the men's tournament at the 1996 Summer Olympics.

References

1970 births
Living people
French male handball players
Olympic handball players of France
Handball players at the 1996 Summer Olympics
Sportspeople from Créteil